Ed Sheeran is an English singer-songwriter. He began recording in 2005 and moved to London in 2008 to pursue a music career. In early 2011, he released his eighth independent extended play, No. 5 Collaborations Project; with it, Sheeran gained mainstream attention. Three months later, Sheeran was signed to Asylum/Atlantic Records.

Sheeran broke through commercially in June 2011, when his debut single, "The A Team", debuted at No. 3 on the UK Singles Chart. Buoyed by the chart success of the singles, "The A Team" and "Lego House", his debut album, +, has been certified sextuple platinum in the United Kingdom. In 2012, he won two BRITISH Awards for Best British Male Solo Artist, and British Breakthrough of the Year, while "The A Team" also won the Ivor Novello Award for Best Song Musically and Lyrically.

4Music Video Honours

!
|-
|2011
|rowspan="1"|Ed Sheeran
|Best Breakthrough
|rowspan=1 
| style="text-align:center;"|
|-
|2012
|"Drunk"
|Best Video
|  
| style="text-align:center;"| 
|-
|2014
|Ed Sheeran
|Best Boy
|
| style="text-align:center;"|

African Entertainment Awards USA

All Africa Music Awards

American Music Awards

!Ref
|-
|rowspan="5"|2015
|rowspan="3"|Ed Sheeran
|Artist of the Year
|
|rowspan="5"|
|-
|Favorite Pop/Rock Male Artist
|
|-
|Favorite Adult Contemporary Artist
|
|-
|x
|Favorite Pop/Rock Album
|
|-
|"Thinking Out Loud"
|Single of the Year
|
|-
|rowspan="5"|2017
|rowspan="3"|Ed Sheeran
|Artist of the Year
|
|rowspan="5"|
|-
|Favorite Pop/Rock Male Artist
|
|-
|Favorite Adult Contemporary Artist
|
|-
|rowspan="2"|"Shape of You"
|Favorite Pop/Rock Song
|
|-
|Video of the Year
|
|-
|rowspan="6"|2018
|rowspan="3"|Ed Sheeran
|Artist of the Year
|
|rowspan="6"|
|-
|Favorite Pop/Rock Male Artist
|
|-
|Favorite Adult Contemporary Artist
|
|-
|"Perfect"
|Favorite Pop/Rock Song
|
|-
|÷
|Favorite Pop/Rock Album
|
|-
|÷ Tour
|Tour of the Year
|
|-
|rowspan="1"|2019
|÷ Tour
|Tour of the Year
|
|
|-
|rowspan="1"|2021
|Ed Sheeran
|Favorite Pop/Rock Male Artist
|
|
|-
|rowspan="2"|2022
|Ed Sheeran
|Favorite Pop/Rock Male Artist
|
|-
|Ed Sheeran
||Tour of the Year
|
|
|}

APRA Awards

|-
| 2013
| "Lego House"
| rowspan="4" | International Work of the Year
| rowspan="3" 
|-
| 2017
| "Love Yourself"
|-
| rowspan="2" | 2018
| "Castle on the Hill"
|-
| "Shape of You"
| 
|}

ARIA Music Awards 

! Lost to
!
|-
|2012
|rowspan="2"| +
|rowspan="8"| Best International Artist
|rowspan="8" 
|One Direction - Up All Night 
| style="text-align:center;"|
|-
|2013
|One Direction - Take Me Home
| style="text-align:center;"|
|-
|2014
|rowspan="2"| x
|One Direction - Midnight Memories
| style="text-align:center;"|
|-
|2015
|One Direction - Four
| style="text-align:center;"|
|-
|2017
|÷ & Loose Change
|Harry Styles - Harry Styles
|-
|2018
| ÷
|Camila Cabello - Camila
|-
|2019
|No.6 Collaborations Project
|Taylor Swift - Lover
|-
|2022
|=
|Harry Styles - Harry's House
|-

BBC Music Awards

!
|-
| rowspan="2"|2014
|Ed Sheeran
|British Artist of the Year
|
| style="text-align:center;" rowspan="2"|
|-
|"Sing"
|Song of the Year
|
|-
| rowspan="2"|2015
|Ed Sheeran
|British Artist of the Year
|
|style="text-align:center;"|
|-
|"Bloodstream"
|Song of the Year
|
|style="text-align:center;"|
|-
|rowspan=2|2017
|Ed Sheeran
|Artist of the Year
|
| rowspan="2"|
|-
|÷
|British Album of the Year
|

BBC Radio 1's Teen Awards

!
|-
|rowspan="1"|2011
|rowspan="1"|"The A Team"
|rowspan="1"|Best British Single
|
|style="text-align:center;" rowspan="1"|
|-
|rowspan="1"|2014
|rowspan="4"|Ed Sheeran
|rowspan="4"|Best British Solo Act
|
|style="text-align:center;" rowspan="1"|
|-
|rowspan="1"|2015
|
|style="text-align:center;" rowspan="1"|
|-
|rowspan="1"|2017
|
|style="text-align:center;" rowspan="1"|
|-
|rowspan="2"|2018
|
|style="text-align:center;" rowspan="2"|
|-
|rowspan="1"|"Perfect Duet"  
|rowspan="1"|Best Single
|

Billboard Latin Music Awards

!
|-
|2016
|Ed Sheeran
|Crossover Artist of the Year
|
|
|}

Billboard Music Award

!
|-
| rowspan="5" | 2015
| rowspan="4" | Ed Sheeran
| Top Male Artist
| rowspan="8" 
| rowspan="5" style="text-align:center;" | 
|-
| Top Billboard 200 Artist
|-
| Top Radio Songs Artist
|-
| Top Digital Songs Artist
|-
| x
| Top Billboard 200 Album
|-
| rowspan="3" | 2016
| rowspan="2" | Ed Sheeran
| Top Male Artist
| rowspan="3" style="text-align:center;" | 
|-
| Top Radio Songs Artist
|-
| x
| Top Billboard 200 Album
|-
| rowspan="15" | 2018
| rowspan="9" | Ed Sheeran
| Top Artist
| rowspan="2" 
| rowspan="15" |
|-
| Top Male Artist
|-
| Top Billboard 200 Artist
| 
|-
| Top Hot 100 Artist
| rowspan="3" 
|-
| Top Song Sales Artist
|-
| Top Radio Songs Artist
|-
| Top Streaming Artist
| rowspan="4" 
|-
| Top Touring Artist
|-
| Billboard Chart Achievement
|-
| rowspan="3" | "Shape of You"
| Top Hot 100 Song
|-
| Top Radio Song
| 
|-
| Top Streaming Song (Video)
| rowspan="4" 
|-
| "Perfect"
| Top Selling Song
|-
| rowspan="2" | ÷
| Top Billboard 200 Album
|-
| Top Selling Album
|-
| rowspan="2" | 2019
| rowspan="2" | Ed Sheeran
| Top Male Artist
| 
|-
| Top Touring Artist
| 

|-
| rowspan="9" | 2022
| rowspan="5" | Ed Sheeran
| Top Male Artist
| 

| rowspan="9" |
|-
| Top Billboard Global Artist
| 
|-
| Top Billboard Global (Excl. US) Artist
| 
|-
| Top Radio Song Artist
| 
|-
|Top Song Sales Artist
| 
|-
| rowspan="4" | "Bad Habits"

| Top Selling Song
| 
|-
| Top Radio Song
| 
|-
| Top Billboard Global (Excl. US) Song
| 
|-
| Top Billboard Global Artist Song
| 
|-
|}

BMI Awards

BMI Country Awards

!
|-
| 2020
| "Tip of My Tongue"
| Top 50 Songs
| 
| 
|-
|}

BMI London Awards
The Broadcast Music, Incorporated (BMI) Awards is an annual award show hosted for the purpose of giving awards to songwriters. Songwriters are selected each year from the entire BMI catalog, based on the number of performances during the award period.

!
|-
| 2013
| "The A Team"
| rowspan="6" | Pop Award Songs
| 
| 
|-
| rowspan="3" | 2014
| "Everything Has Changed" 
| 
| rowspan="3" | 
|-
| "Lego House"
| 
|-
| "Little Things"
| 
|-
| rowspan="3" | 2016
| "Photograph"
| 
| rowspan="3" | 
|-
| rowspan="3" | "Thinking Out Loud" 
| 
|-
| Song of the Year
| 
|-
| rowspan="4" | 2017
| Million Performance Songs
| 
| rowspan="4" | 
|-
| "Cold Water"
| rowspan="2" | Pop Award Songs
| 
|-
| rowspan="2" | "Love Yourself" 
| 
|-
| rowspan="2" | Song of the Year
| 
|-
| rowspan="6" | 2018
| rowspan="3" | "Shape of You"
| 
| rowspan="6" | 
|-
| Million Performance Award
| 
|-
| rowspan="8" | Pop Award Songs
| 
|-
| "Castle on the Hill"
| 
|-
| "Perfect"
| 
|-
| "Strip That Down"
| 
|-
| rowspan="5" | 2019
| "Eastside"
| 
| rowspan="5" | 
|-
| "End Game" 
| 
|-
| "River" 
| 
|-
| "The Rest of Our Life
| 
|-
| "Shape of You"
| Million Performance Award
| 
|-
| rowspan="9" | 2020
| "2002"
| rowspan="6" | Pop Award Songs
| 
| rowspan="9" | 
|-
| "Beautiful People" 
| 
|-
| "Cross Me" 
| 
|-
| "I Don't Care" 
| 
|-
| "Tip of My Tongue
| 
|-
| "What Am I"
| 
|-
| "Shape of You"
| rowspan="5" | Million Performance Award
| 
|-
| "Perfect"
| 
|-
| "Thinking Out Loud"
| 
|-
| rowspan="4" | 2021
| "Shape of You"
| 
| rowspan="4" | 
|-
| "Love Yourself"
| 
|-
| "South of the Border" 
| rowspan="2" | Most Performed Songs of the Year
| 
|-
| "Underdog"
| 
|-

| rowspan="4" | 2022
| Bad Habits
|  Song of the Year
| 
| rowspan="4" | 
|-
| Afterglow
| rowspan="3" | Most Performed Songs of the Year
| 
|-
|Shivers
| 
|-
| Bad Habits
| 

|-
|}

BMI Pop Awards

!
|-
| 2014
| "The A Team"
| Award Winning Songs
| 
| 
|-
| rowspan="4" | 2015
| Ed Sheeran
| Songwriter of the Year
| 
| rowspan="4" | 
|-
| "Everything Has Changed" 
| rowspan="8" | Award Winning Songs
| 
|-
| "Lego House"
| 
|-
| "Sing"
| 
|-
| rowspan="3" | 2016
| "Don't"
| 
| rowspan="3" | 
|-
| "Photograph"
| 
|-
| Thinking Out Loud
| 
|-
| rowspan="2" | 2017
| "Cold Water"
| 
| rowspan="2" | 
|-
| "Love Yourself"
| 
|-
| rowspan="4" | 2018
| rowspan="2" | "Shape of You"
| Song of the Year
| 
| rowspan="4" | 
|-
| rowspan="9" | Award Winning Songs
| 
|-
| "Castle on the Hill"
| 
|-
| "Strip That Down"
| 
|-
| rowspan="2" | 2019
| "End Game" 
| 
| rowspan="2" | 
|-
| "Perfect"
| 
|-
| rowspan="3" | 2020
| "Beautiful People" 
| 
| rowspan="3" | 
|-
| "Eastside"
| 
|-
| "I Don't Care" 
| 
|-
| 2021
| "South of the Border" 
| 
| 
|-
|}

BreakTudo Awards
BreakTudo Awards (commonly abbreviated as a BTDAs) is a Brazilian award that takes place every year in Brazil

GAFFA Awards

GAFFA Awards (Denmark)
Delivered since 1991. The GAFFA Awards (Danish: GAFFA Prisen) are a Danish award that rewards popular music awarded by the magazine of the same name.

|-
| rowspan="2"|2014
| Ed Sheeran
| International Male Artist of the Year
| 
|-
| X
| International Album of the Year
| 
|-
| rowspan="6"|2018
| Ed Sheeran
| International Solo Artist of the Year
| 
|-
| Divide
| International Album of the Year
| 
|-
| Castle on the Hill
|rowspan="5"| International Hit of the Year
| 
|-
| Galway Girl
| 
|-
| Perfect
| 
|-
| Shape of You
| 
|-
| rowspan="1"|2019
| "River"  
| 
|-
|}

GAFFA Awards (Norway)
Delivered since 2012. The GAFFA Awards (Norwegian: GAFFA Prisen) are a Norwegian award that rewards popular music awarded by the magazine of the same name.

|-
| rowspan="3"|2014
| Ed Sheeran
| International Solo Artist of the Year
| 
|-
| X
| International Album of the Year
| 
|-
| I See Fire
| International Hit of the Year
| 
|-
|}

GAFFA Awards (Sweden)
Delivered since 2010. The GAFFA Awards (Swedish: GAFFA Priset) are a Swedish award that rewards popular music awarded by the magazine of the same name.

!
|-
| rowspan="3"| 2014
| Himself
| Best Foreign Solo Act
| 
| style="text-align:center;" rowspan="3"|
|-
| X
| Best Foreign Album
| 
|-
| "I See Fire"
| rowspan="3"| Best Foreign Song
| 
|-
| 2018
| "Shape of You"
| 
| style="text-align:center;" |
|-
| 2019
| "River"
| 
| style="text-align:center;" |
|-
|}

Gaon Chart Music Awards
The Gaon Chart Music Awards is an annual awards show in South Korea presented by the national music record chart, Gaon Chart.

|-
| align="center"| 2017
| Shape of You
| International Song of the Year
|
|}

Grammy Awards

! 
|-
|2013
| "The A Team"
| Song of the Year
| 
|
|-
|rowspan="2"|2014
| Ed Sheeran
|Best New Artist
| 
|rowspan=2|
|-
|Red (as featured artist)
|rowspan="2"|Album of the Year
| 
|-
|rowspan="3"|2015
| rowspan="2"|x
| 
| rowspan=3|
|-
|Best Pop Vocal Album
| 
|-
| "I See Fire"
|Best Song Written for Visual Media
| 
|-
|rowspan="4"|2016
|rowspan="3"| "Thinking Out Loud"
|Record of the Year
|
|rowspan=4|
|-
|Song of the Year
|
|-
|Best Pop Solo Performance
|
|-
|Beauty Behind the Madness (as featured artist)
|Album of the Year
|
|-
|2017
|"Love Yourself" (as songwriter)
|Song of the Year
|
|
|-
|rowspan="2"|2018
|rowspan="1"| "Shape of You"
|Best Pop Solo Performance
|
|rowspan=2|
|-
|÷
|rowspan="2"|Best Pop Vocal Album
|
|-
|2020
|No.6 Collaborations Project
|
|-
|2022
|Bad Habits
|Song of the Year
|
|-
|2023
|"Bam Bam" (with Camila Cabello)
| Best Pop Duo/Group Performance
|
|}

Goldene Kamera

Global Awards

Houston Film Critics Society Awards

IFPI Awards
The International Federation of the Phonographic Industry is the organisation that represents the interests of the recording industry worldwide

Joox Thailand Music Awards 

!
|-
| 2017
| rowspan="2"| Ed Sheeran
| rowspan="2"| International Artist of the Year
| 
| style="text-align:center;"| 
|-
| 2018
| 
| style="text-align:center;"| 
|}

Juno Awards 

!
|-
| 2018
| rowspan="1"| ÷
| rowspan="2"| International Album of the Year
| 
| style="text-align:center;"|
|-
| 2020
| No.6 Collaborations Project
| 
|-
| 2023
| =
| International Album of the Year
| 
|}

LOS40 Music Awards

|-
| 2014 || x || Best International Album || 
|-
| rowspan="2" | 2015 || "Thinking Out Loud" || Best International Song || rowspan="2" 
|-
| rowspan="2" | Ed Sheeran || Best International Act
|-
| rowspan="5" | 2017 || International Artist of the Year || rowspan="2" 
|-
| ÷ || International Album of the Year
|-
| rowspan="2" | "Shape of You" || International Song of the Year || rowspan="3" 
|-
| International Video of the Year
|-
| ÷ Tour || Tour of the Year
|-
| rowspan="2" | 2018 ||Ed Sheeran || International Artist of the Year || rowspan="1" 
|-
| rowspan="1" | "Perfect"  || International Song of the Year || rowspan="1" 
|-
| rowspan="3" | 2019 || Ed Sheeran || International Artist of the Year || 
|-
| No. 6 Collaborations Project || International Album of the Year || 
|-
| "I Don't Care"  || International Song of the Year || 
|-
| rowspan="4" | 2021 || rowspan="2" | Ed Sheeran || International Artist of the Year || 
|-
| International Live Artist of the Year || 
|-
| rowspan=2 | "Bad Habits" || International Song of the Year || 
|-
| International Video of the Year || 
|-
| rowspan="3" | 2022
| =
| Best International Album
| 
|-
| rowspan="2" | "Bam Bam" 
| Best International Song
| 
|-
| Best International Collaboration
| 
|}

Lunas del Auditorio

!
|-
| 2017
| Ed Sheeran
| Pop in Foreign Language
| 
| 
|}

Melon Music Awards

Mnet Asian Music Awards

MOBO Awards

MTV Awards

MTV Europe Music Awards

MTV Italian Music Awards

MTV Video Music Awards

!
|-
| 2013
|"Lego House"
| Best Male Video
| 
| style="text-align:center;"|
|-
| 2014
| "Sing" (featuring Pharrell Williams)
| Best Male Video
| 
| style="text-align:center;"|
|-
|rowspan="6"| 2015
|rowspan="4"| "Thinking Out Loud"
| Video of the Year
| 
| style="text-align:center;" rowspan="6"|
|-
| Best Male Video
| 
|-
| Best Pop Video
| 
|-
| Best Cinematography
| 
|-
|rowspan="2"| "Don't"
| Best Choreography
| 
|-
| Best Editing
| 
|-
|rowspan="3"| 2017
| Ed Sheeran
| Artist of the Year
| 
|rowspan="3"  style="text-align:center;"|
|-
| "Shape of You"
| Best Pop
| 
|-
| "Castle on the Hill"
| Best Cinematography
| 
|-
|rowspan="4"| 2018
|rowspan="3"|  "Perfect"
| Song of the Year
| 
|rowspan="4" style="text-align:center;"|
|-
| Best Pop
| 
|-
| Best Direction
| 
|-
| "River" 
| Best Cinematography
| 
|-
| rowspan="2"| 2019
| rowspan="2"| "I Don't Care" 
| Best Collaboration
| 
| rowspan="2" style="text-align:center;"|
|-
| Song of Summer
| 
|-
| 2020
| "Beautiful People" 
| Best Collaboration
| 
| style="text-align:center;"|
|-
| rowspan="4"| 2021
| rowspan="4"| "Bad Habits"
| Video of the Year
| 
| rowspan="3" style="text-align:center;"|
|-
| Best Choreography
| 
|-
| Best Art Direction
| 
|-
| Song of Summer
| 
| style="text-align:center;"|

|-
|rowspan="5"| 2022
|rowspan="3"|  "Shivers"
| Video of the Year
| 
|rowspan="5" style="text-align:center;"|
|-
| Best Pop Video
| 
|-
| Best Direction
| 
|-
| Ed Sheeran
| Artist of the Year
| 
|-
| "Bam Bam" 
| Best Cinematography
|

MTV Video Music Awards Japan

!
|-
| 2017
|"Shape of You"
| Best Pop International Video
| 
| style="text-align:center;"|

MTV Millennial Awards

!
|-
| rowspan="3"| 2018
| "River" (ft. Eminem)
| Collaboration of the Year
| 

|-
| "Perfect" 
| International Hit of the Year
| 
|-
| Ed Sheeran
| Global Instagrammer
|

MTV Millennial Awards Brazil

!
|-
| 2021
| "Bad Habits"
| Global Hit
| 
| style="text-align:center;"|

Myx Music Awards

!
|-
|rowspan="1" | 2018
|"Perfect" 
| International Video of the Year
|

Nickelodeon Kids' Choice Awards

Nickelodeon Kids' Choice Awards

!
|-
|rowspan="2"|2016
|Ed Sheeran
|Favorite Male Singer
|
|rowspan=2|
|-
|"Thinking Out Loud"
|rowspan="2"|Favorite Song
|
|-
|rowspan="2"|2018
|"Shape of You"
|
|rowspan="2"|
|-
|rowspan="2"|Ed Sheeran
|rowspan="2"|Favorite Male Singer
|
|-
|rowspan="2"|2020
|
|rowspan="2"|
|-
|"I Don't Care" 
|Favorite Music Collaboration
|

|-
|rowspan="2"|2023
|"Bam Bam" 
|Favorite Music Collaboration
|
|-
|Ed Sheeran
|Favorite Male Singer
|
|}

Nickelodeon UK Kids' Choice Awards

Meus Prêmios Nick
The Meus Prêmios Nick is an annual awards show that awards entertainers with a blimp trophy, as voted by kids on internet. 

!
|-
| 2015
| Ed Sheeran
| Favorite International Artist
| 
| style="text-align:center;" |
|}

NME Awards

NRJ Music Awards

People's Choice Awards

!
|-
| rowspan="2"| 2015
| ×
| Favorite Album
| rowspan="2" 
| style="text-align:center;" rowspan="2"|  
|-
| rowspan="5"| Ed Sheeran
| rowspan="1"|Favorite Male Artist
|-
| rowspan="2"| 2016
| Favorite Male Artist
| 
| style="text-align:center;" rowspan="2"|
|-
| Favorite Pop Artist
| 
|-
| rowspan="1"| 2018
| |Male Artist of the Year
| 
| style="text-align:center;" rowspan="1"|
|- 
| rowspan="3"| 2019
| Male Artist of the Year
| 
|-
|"I Don't Care"
| Song of the Year
|
|-
|No.6 Collaborations Project
| Album of the Year
|
|-
| rowspan="2"| 2022
| Mathematics Tour
| Concert Tour of the Year
| 
|-
|"Bam Bam" 
| Collaboration of the Year
|

Pollstar Awards
The Pollstar Awards is an annual award ceremony to honor artists and professionals in the concert industry held by "Pollstar".

The Pop Hub Awards 
The Pop Hub Awards is an annual internet fan-voted award show in Poland.

RTHK International Pop Poll Awards 

!
|-
|rowspan=7|2022
|rowspan="1"| Ed Sheeran
|rowspan=1| International Male Artist
|
|rowspan=7|
|-
|rowspan=6|Top 10 International Songs

|rowspan="1"|"Merry Christmas" 
|
|-
|rowspan="1"|"Bam Bam" 
|
|-
|rowspan="1"|"2step" 
|
|-
|rowspan="1"| "Bad Habits"
|
|-
|rowspan="1"|"Shivers" 
|
|-
|rowspan="1"|"Visiting Hours" 
|
|}

Satellite Awards

|-
|2014
|"I See Fire"
|Best Original Song
|
|}

Silver Clef Award

Swiss Music Awards

!
|-
|rowspan="2"|2015
|rowspan="1"|Ed Sheeran
|Best Act International
|
| style="text-align:center;" rowspan="2"|
|-
|"I See Fire"
|Best Hit International
|
|-
|rowspan="2"|2018
|rowspan="1"|Ed Sheeran
|Best Act International
|
| style="text-align:center;" rowspan="2"|
|-
|"Shape of You"
|Best Hit International
|
|-
| 2022
| Ed Sheeran
| Best International Solo Act
| 
| style="text-align:center;"|

Teen Choice Awards

!
|-
| 2013
| Choice Breakout Artist
| rowspan="2"|Ed Sheeran
| rowspan="3" 
| style="text-align:center;"|
|-
|rowspan="2"|2014
|Choice Male Artist
| style="text-align:center;" rowspan="2"|
|-
|Choice Song: Male Artist
|"Sing" (featuring Pharrell Williams)
|-
|rowspan="6"|2015
|Choice Male Artist
|rowspan="2"|Ed Sheeran
|rowspan="3" 
| style="text-align:center;" rowspan="6"|
|-
|Choice Summer Music Star Male
|-
|Choice Song: Male Artist
|rowspan="2"|"Thinking Out Loud"
|-
|Choice Love Song
|rowspan="3" 
|-
|Choice Break-Up Song
|"Don't"
|-
|Choice Summer Tour
|x Tour
|-
| rowspan=3|2017
| Choice Male Artist
| Ed Sheeran
| 
|rowspan=3|
|-
| Choice Song: Male Artist
|rowspan="2"| "Shape of You"
| 
|-
| Choice Pop Song
|
|-
| rowspan=3|2018
| Choice Male Artist
| Ed Sheeran
| 
|rowspan=3|

|-
| Choice Song: Male Artist
|rowspan="1"| "Perfect"
| 
|-
| Choice Collaboration
|rowspan="1"| "End Game"  (featuring Taylor Swift and Future)
| 
|-

Telehit Awards

TEC Awards

UK Music Video Awards

!
|-
| rowspan="2"| 2011
| rowspan="2"| "You Need Me, I Don't Need You"
| Best Urban Video – UK
| 
| style="text-align:center;" rowspan="2"|
|-
| Best Editing in a Video
| 
|-
| 2014
| "Don't"
| Best Choreography in a Video
| 
| style="text-align:center;"|
|-
| rowspan="2"| 2015
| Ed Sheeran
| Best Artist
| 
| rowspan="2" style="text-align:center;"|
|-
| "Thinking Out Loud"
| Best Choreography in a Video
| 
|-
| 2016
| Jumpers For Goalposts: Live at Wembley Stadium
| Best Live Music Coverage
| 
| style="text-align:center;"|
|-
| rowspan="2"| 2017
| rowspan="2"| "Castle on the Hill"
| Best Pop Video – UK
| 
| rowspan="2" style="text-align:center;"|
|-
| Best Cinematography in a Video
| 
|-
| rowspan="2"| 2019
| "Cross Me" 
| rowspan="2"| Best Pop Video – UK
| 
| rowspan="2" style="text-align:center;"|
|-
| "Antisocial" 
| 
|-
| 2021
| "Bad Habits"
| Best Visual Effects in a Video
| 
|

Urban Music Awards

World Music Awards

!
|-
| rowspan="5"|2014
| rowspan="5"|Ed Sheeran
| World's Best Male Artist
| rowspan="3" 
| style="text-align:center;" rowspan="3"|
|-
| World's Best Live Act
|-
| World's Best Entertainer
|-
|World's Best British Solo Acted (Voted)
|rowspan=2 
| style="text-align:center;" rowspan="2"|
|-
|World's Best British Entertainer (Voted)

Young Hollywood Awards

!
|-
| 2014
|Ed Sheeran
|Hottest Music Artist
| 
| style="text-align:center;"|

Other accolades

Honorary degree 
{| class="wikitable sortable plainrowheaders"
|+Name of school, year given, and name of degree
|-
! scope="col" | School
! scope="col" | Year
! scope="col" | Degree
! scope="col" class="unsortable" | 
|-
!scope="row"| University of Suffolk
| 2015
| Honorary Doctorate of Music 
| style="text-align:center;"|

Notes

References

Awards
Sheeran, Ed